The 2003–04 Algerian Championnat National was the 42nd season of the Algerian Championnat National since its establishment in 1962. A total of 16 teams contested the league, with USM Alger as the defending champions, The Championnat started on August 14, 2003. and ended on May 24, 2004.

Team summaries

Promotion and relegation 
Teams promoted from Algerian Division 2 2003-2004 
 CS Constantine
 OMR El Annasser
 GC Mascara

Teams relegated to Algerian Division 2 2004-2005
 CA Batna
 RC Kouba
 JSM Béjaïa

League table

Result table

References

External links
2003–04 Algerian Championnat National

Algerian Championnat National
Championnat National
Algerian Ligue Professionnelle 1 seasons